The South Chatham Village Historic District is a historic district encompassing much of the linear village of South Chatham in Chatham, Massachusetts.  Extending eastward from the Harwich town line along Main Street, the district developed in the 18th and 19th centuries as a maritime and farming village.  The district was listed on the National Register of Historic Places in 2022.

Description and history
The South Chatham Village is a largely linear area extending along Main Street (Massachusetts Route 28) between the Harwich line to the west, and Cockle Cove Road to the east.  The area contains an architecturally diverse collection of residential, civic, and commercial buildings dating from the 18th to 20th centuries.  Unusual in the village are a higher than normal collection of two-story frame residences, in a region otherwise dominated by single-story and 1-1/2 story residential buildings.  The historic district also extends for short distances along Pleasant Street and Forest Beech Road.

Main Street was laid out in the 17th century, as the primary road between Chatham and Harwich villages, and remained rural in character until the 19th century.  By the mid-19th century the village began to take shape, and its first post office opened in 1862.  A small number of Cape Code-style houses survive from the 18th century in the village, which also includes a representation of Greek Revival architecture from its first period of significant growth.  Later buildings of architectural significance include the Queen Anne style South Chatham School (built 1903), which marks the eastern end of the district.

See also
National Register of Historic Places listings in Barnstable County, Massachusetts

References

Historic districts in Barnstable County, Massachusetts
Chatham, Massachusetts
National Register of Historic Places in Barnstable County, Massachusetts
Historic districts on the National Register of Historic Places in Massachusetts